Brunswick School is a private, college-preparatory school for boys in Greenwich, Connecticut, United States. It was founded in 1902 by George B. Carmichael.

History 
Brunswick School was founded in 1902 by George B. Carmichael. The school is a college preparatory day school serving approximately 1,020 boys in grades pre-kindergarten through 12.

Facilities 

Brunswick school is made up of two main campuses. The Upper School campus is located on Maher Avenue in Greenwich. The Upper School English and History annex is located on North Maple Avenue, a short walk from the main Upper School facility, occupying the former Preschool campus. Also found at the North Maple facility is the Brunswick Career Center, which puts an emphasis on preparing recent alumni for the workforce. The Edwards Campus (named after former headmaster Duncan Edwards, II) is located about 15 minutes away from the Maher Avenue campus on King Street. The Edwards Campus is made up of the Lower School and Preschool School  facilities, along with the Burke Fieldhouse (basketball, wrestling, tennis, and the Cosby Weight Room) and the Sampson Fieldhouse (which houses the Dann O'Neil Gym, the Stephens Squash Courts, and Hartong Rink). The Edwards Campus also hosts a set of rowing tanks in the Preschool. Additionally, Brunswick owns a boat house, the Falco Rowing Center, located on River Road, just a ten-minute drive from the Upper School campus. Brunswick also owns a satellite campus in Randolph, VT, called the Randolph Campus. The campus is used for sophomore leadership trips during the school year.

Athletics facilities 
 Mehra Natatorium
 Sampson Athletic Center
 Burke Field House 
 Falco Rowing Center

Coordination with Greenwich Academy 
Brunswick's sister school is Greenwich Academy, which is located two blocks from Brunswick's Upper School campus. The two schools share classes with each other during Upper School, and students are able to choose courses from a combined course catalogue, with the exception of mathematics courses and ninth grade English, which remain separate. The connection between Greenwich Academy and Brunswick dates back to the school's founding. The founder of Brunswick had been previously employed as a teacher at Greenwich Academy, which was then a co-educational secondary school.  After the founding of Brunswick, Greenwich Academy began admitting girls alone, directing boys to apply to Brunswick School.

Notable alumni

Akin Akingbala, former basketball player for Clemson University and the Boston Celtics
Hayward Alker, international relations scholar
Neil Burger, film director
Peter Corroon, former mayor of Salt Lake County, Utah
Peter Fonda, actor
John Hayden, ice hockey player for the Arizona Coyotes
Pete Francis Heimbold, former member of the band Dispatch
Matthew Heineman, Oscar-nominated filmmaker
Justin Henry, actor
Chris Jenkins (sound engineer), Oscar-winning sound engineer
Hugh Jessiman, hockey player
Cornelius Johnson (wide receiver), American football player
Rod Lurie, film director
David J. Malan, Harvard professor
Mitch Marrow, American football player
Justin McAuliffe, businessman and member of the Hilton family
Ian Murray, co-founder of Vineyard Vines
Shep Murray, co-founder of Vineyard Vines
Aaron Sabato, baseball player
James Sands, soccer player
Brad Seaton, Football player at Villanova, NFL Offensive Tackle
Kevin Shattenkirk, hockey player
Alex Shibutani, Olympic figure skater
Bill Simmons, sports columnist
Christopher Tsai, investment manager and art collector
Cameron Winklevoss, Olympic rower and social networking pioneer
Tyler Winklevoss, Olympic rower and social networking pioneer

References

External links 
 
 Greenwich Academy's coordination with Brunswick
 Brunswick School News

Schools in Greenwich, Connecticut
Private elementary schools in Connecticut
Private middle schools in Connecticut
Private high schools in Connecticut
Preparatory schools in Connecticut
Boys' schools in the United States
Educational institutions established in 1902
1902 establishments in Connecticut